Karaçörtlen is a village in the Çilimli District of Düzce Province in Turkey. Its population is 366 (2022).

References

Villages in Çilimli District